was a politician and bureaucrat of the Ryukyu Kingdom.

Urasoe Chōshi was the sixth son of Prince Urasoe Chōkyō. He was also an uncle of King Shō Nei. After Shō Nei ascended to the throne, he became a member of the Sanshikan. He was pro-Chinese and supported his colleague Jana Ueekata. In the spring of 1609, Satsuma invaded Ryukyu and besieged Shuri Castle. Chōshi's three sons, Makaru, Mayamado and Momochiyo, were killed in the battle.

After King Shō Nei's surrender, Chōshi was taken to Kagoshima together with King Shō Nei and a number of high officials by Satsuma troops. King Shō Nei was released and went back to Ryukyu together with many ministers in 1611, except for two pro-Chinese high ministers: Urasoe Chōshi and Jana Ueekata Rizan. Chōshi was held as hostage, and Rizan was executed. Chōshi was removed from his position and remained in Satsuma until 1616. He died in Shuri at the age of 61.

References
Chūzan Seifu, vol.7
向姓家譜（小祿家）
喜安日記写者及び年代不詳 - 伊波普猷文庫

1558 births
1620 deaths
Ueekata
Sanshikan
People of the Ryukyu Kingdom
Ryukyuan people
16th-century Ryukyuan people
17th-century Ryukyuan people